Vytautas Kaupas (born 1 April 1982 in Vilnius) is a Lithuanian former professional racing cyclist.

Major results

2003
 1st  National Road Race Championships
2004
 1st Stage 6 Tour of Bulgaria
 2nd National Time Trial Championships
2005
 3rd Grand Prix de la Ville de Lillers
 3rd National Road Race Championships
 3rd Belsele-Puivelde
2006
 1st Antwerpse Havenpijl
2007
 1st Grand Prix de Beuvry-la-Forêt
2010
 1st  National Road Race Championships
 1st Grand Prix de la ville de Nogent-sur-Oise

References

1982 births
Living people
Lithuanian male cyclists